"Hustler Musik" is the second single from Lil Wayne's 2005 album Tha Carter II. Although popular, it failed to live up on the Billboard chart to other singles put out by Lil Wayne. The song received airplay on East Coast radio stations and moderate airplay elsewhere, and a music video was also shot for it which also received moderate airplay. Lil Wayne has stated that this was one of his favorite songs he ever recorded. A remix was made sampling Anita Baker's "Mystery".

Music video
The music video was shot in New York City by Benny Boom. The music video features a colored "Hustler Musik" for the first half, and features the hook and first verse to the song "Money on My Mind" (also featured on his album Tha Carter II) in which the video changes scenes and is portrayed in black and white.

Charts

Certifications

References

External links
 Hustler Musik/Money On My Mind Music Video Vevo

2006 singles
Lil Wayne songs
Music videos directed by Benny Boom
Songs written by Lil Wayne
Cash Money Records singles
Trap music songs
Songs written by Birdman (rapper)